Saint-Jean-d'Angély (Saintongeais: Sént-Jhan-d'Anjhéli) is a commune in the Charente-Maritime department in southwestern France.

The commune has its historical origins in the Abbey of Saint-Jean-d'Angély.

Royal abbey
Founded in the ninth century to house a relic of Saint John the Baptist, and rebuilt in the 14th, 17th and 18th centuries because of repeated destruction, then later abandoned, the Abbey is now a listed building. It remains the most remarkable piece of architecture of Saint-Jean-d'Angély, a town which has kept all its medieval charm. Situated on the pilgrim route that led to Santiago de Compostela the edifice still constitutes a major stopping-off point towards Santiago de Compostela. Since 1989, the Royal Abbey has housed the Centre of European Culture, which has breathed new life into the Abbey by restoring it as a historical and cultural site and as a place for the exchange of ideas.

From 1989 to 1997, the restoration of the monastic buildings has been carried out according to the needs of the Centre of European Culture, with an emphasis placed on accommodations, catering, as well as rooms for conferences, reunions and workshops. The Centre has been at the forefront of the revitalization of the building, to such a point that today the Centre and the Abbey have been linked in the minds of the residents.

Centre of European culture
The Centre of European Culture at Saint-Jean-d'Angély, created in 1989 as a joint initiative taken by the Minister of Culture, the town of Saint-Jean-d'Angély, the regional council of Poitou-Charentes and the council of Charente Maritime, has hosted multinational sessions focused on European culture and citizenship that are dedicated to youngsters sixteen to nineteen years, coming from all European countries.

Modern Saint-Jean
Saint-Jean-d'Angely is now home to a vibrant and bustling town centre, with a twice-weekly market (on Saturdays and Wednesdays). Also present is a swimming and fitness centre, Atlantys, which is situated on the edge of the town.

Geography
The Boutonne flows northwest through the commune; the town lies on its right bank.

Twin towns – sister cities
 Koumondè, Togo
 Mondsee, Austria
 New Iberia, United States
 Saint-Sulpice, Canada

Population

See also
Communes of the Charente-Maritime department

References

External links

 The Centre of European Culture

Communes of Charente-Maritime
Subprefectures in France
World Heritage Sites in France
Charente-Maritime communes articles needing translation from French Wikipedia
County of Saintonge